Alpens is a municipality situated in the Lluçanès zone, within the comarca of Osona, in the province of Barcelona, Catalonia, Spain. Alpens is located 105 km from the city of Barcelona and 35 km from the comarca capital, Vic.

In the municipal area there are ruins of a fortress which dates to the year 1109, the fortress of Freixenet. It is one of the places catalogued by the government as sites of Spanish cultural heritage. There is also the 10th-century church of Sant Pere de Serrallonga.

In 2015, the municipality voted to join a proposed new comarca of Lluçanès, but the plan was put on hold due to insufficient support.

References

External links 
Official website 
 Government data pages 

Municipalities in Osona
Populated places in Osona